= San José Norte =

Coordinates: 26°47′S 66°04′W

- Municipality and town
- Interactive map of San José Norte
- Country: Argentina
- Province: Catamarca Province
- Time zone: UTC−3 (ART)

San José Norte is a town and municipality in Catamarca Province in northwestern Argentina.
